For other places with the same name, see Rattlesnake Island (disambiguation).

Rattlesnake Island is a small island on Okanagan Lake located directly east of Peachland, British Columbia, Canada. The land and shore surrounding the island form part of Okanagan Mountain Park. Legend has it that the lake monster, Ogopogo, lives in a cave on Rattlesnake Island earning the small land mass the nickname "Monster Island".

In the early 1970s, Eddy Haymour developed the island as a tourist attraction which included a mini-golf course with a replica of the Great Pyramid at Giza and a giant camel. The provincial government blocked the project shortly after it opened. In 1986 the BC Supreme Court ordered the Province of British Columbia to pay Eddy Haymour $250,000 in damages for their "highly improper" actions. A documentary about this affair, Eddy's Kingdom, was released in 2020.

On August 16, 2003, a lightning strike near the island started the 2003 Okanagan Mountain Park Fire that burned a large portion of the surrounding park.

Gallery

References

External links
The Fifth Estate - Eddy Haymour and Rattlesnake Island 1985
 The History of Rattlesnake Island

Okanagan
Regional District of Central Okanagan
Lake islands of British Columbia
Tourist attractions in the Okanagan
Articles containing video clips